In 2006, the 100th edition of the Giro di Lombardia cycling race took place on 14 October, in and around the Italian region of Lombardy. It was won by World Champion Paolo Bettini who dedicated the victory to his brother who had recently died.

This race marked the end of the 2006 UCI ProTour calendar, with Alejandro Valverde taking the overall title and setting a new record for most ProTour points amassed in one season.

General Standings

14 October 2006: Mendrisio-Como, 

10th-place finisher Andrea Pagoto does not ride on a UCI ProTour team and is ineligible for points.

References

External links
Race website

2006 UCI ProTour
2006
2006 in Italian sport